was a Japanese animation artist and character designer.

Career
He developed an interest for drawing at age five. He graduated in Aichi Prefecture. In 1955, at age sixteen, he debuted as a cartoonist in the "Machi" magazine. He then joined Mushi Production as animator in 1965 and later founded Studio Jaguar in 1966. In 1970, he debuted as animation director in the Mushi TV Series "Joe of Tomorrow", and later worked on the anime adaptations of several of Go Nagai's manga, including Devilman (1972), Cutie Honey (1973), and UFO Robo Grendizer (1975), serving as a character designer on the latter two.  With his work on Cutie Honey as well as Mahō no Mako-chan, Mahou Tsukai Chappy, Majokko Megu-chan, and Hana no Ko Lunlun, Araki was an important figure in Toei Animation's early magical girl anime series of the 1970s.

He usually collaborated with animation director Michi Himeno, whom he met in 1973. They formed Araki Production in 1975. He worked as animation director in 1978's "Goodbye Battleship Yamato: Warriors of Love". He, with Himeno, have been celebrated for their success. The Araki-Himeno duo collaborated on TV series and animated films such as "Saint Seiya" (1986–89), "Saint Seiya Overture" from 2004.

Some of his successes are Majokko Megu-chan (1974), Lupin III (1977), Mugen Kido SSX (Captain Harlock, 1978), Versailles no Bara (Lady Oscar, 1979), Hana no Ko Lunlun (Angel, 1979, which featured character designs by Michi Himeno and animation by Araki), and Fūma no Kojirō (1991). International accreditation came with Saint Seiya (Knights of the Zodiac, 1986), for his dynamic drawing style along with the elegant drawings styles of Michi. This Dynamic Duel, as they are known, have been instrumental in the success of the series.

Working for Toei Animation and Tokyo Movie Shinsha, Araki was also an animator on several American and French productions which outsourced animation work to Japan, including Ulysses 31 (1981), Inspector Gadget (Season 1, 1983–84, animation), Mighty Orbots (1984, key animation), The Adventures of the American Rabbit (1986) and G.I. Joe: The Movie (1987).

Works

Anime television series 
 Attack No. 1 (TV)1969 : Animation.
 Tomorrow's Joe (TV)1970 : Animation director. (EP 4,6,9,13,16,18,21,23,26,30,34,40,47,50,56,62,66,71,76)
 Mahō no Mako-chan (TV)1970 : Animation director. (EP 30,34,42)
 Moonlight Mask (TV)1972 : Animation.
 Mahou Tsukai Chappy (TV)1972 : Animation director.
 Devilman (TV)1972 : Animation director. (EP 4)
 Cutie Honey (TV)1973 : Character Design, Animation director.
 Babel II (TV)1973 : Character Design, Animation director.
 Majokko Megu-chan (TV)1974 : Character Design, Animation director.
 UFO Robot Grendizer (TV)1975 : Character Design, Animation director.
 New Star of Giants (TV)1977 : Animation director.
 Wakusei Robo Danguard Ace (TV)1977 : Character Design, Animation director.
 Galaxy Express 999 (TV)1978 : Character Design.
 Hana no Ko Lunlun (TV)1979 : Animation (OP and first episode); Character Design for the series was done by Michi Himeno.
 New Star of Giants II (TV)1979 : Character Design.
 The Rose of Versailles (TV)1979 : Character Design, Animation director.
 Ulysses 31 (TV)1981 : Chief Animation Director.
 Baxinger (TV)1982 : OP Animator.
 Arcadia of My Youth: Endless Orbit SSX (TV)1982 : Animation director.
 Ai Shite Knight (TV)1983 : Animation director.
 Lupin III Part III (TV)1984 : Design Supervisor, Animation director.
 Glass Mask (TV)1984 : OP Animator (often mistakenly credited as Character Designer).
 Mighty Orbots (TV)1984 : Animation.
 Tongari Boushi no Memoru (TV)1984 : Animation director.
 Maple Town (TV)1986 : Animation director.
 Saint Seiya (TV)1986 : Character Design, Animation director.
 Yokoyama Mitsuteru Sangokushi (TV)1991 : Character Design, Animation director.
 Aoki Densetsu Shoot! (TV)1993 : Character Design, Animation director.
 Gegege no Kitaro (TV 4/1996) : Character Design.
 Kindaichi Case Files (TV)1997 : Character Design.
 Yu-Gi-Oh! (TV)1998 : Character Design.
 Yu-Gi-Oh! Duel Monsters (TV)2000 : Character Design.
 Ring ni Kakero 1: Carnival Champion Hen (TV)2004 : Character Design, Chief Animation Director.
 Ring ni Kakero 1: Nichibei Kessen Hen (TV)2006 : Character Design.

Movies 
 Panda! Go, Panda! (movie)1972 : Animation.
 Cutie Honey (movie)1974 : Animation director.
 Majokko Megu-chan (movie)1974 : Animation director.
 Ikkyū-san Chiekurabe (movie)1977 : Animation director.
 Farewell to Space Battleship Yamato (movie)1978 : Animation director.
 Tomorrow's Joe (movie)1980 : Animation director.
 Cobra: Space Adventure (Movie)1982 : Animation.
 The Adventures of the American Rabbit (Movie)1986 : Animation.
 Saint Seiya: Evil Goddess Eris (movie)1987 : Character Design, Key Animation, Animation director.
 Saint Seiya: The Heated Battle of the Gods (movie)1988 : Character Design, Main Animation Design, Animation director.
 Saint Seiya: Legend of Crimson Youth (movie)1988 : Character Design, Main Animation Design, Animation director.
 The Rose of Versailles (movie)1990 : Animation director.
 Aoki Densetsu Shoot! (movie)1990 : Animation director.
 Gegege no Kitaro : Daikaijū (movie)1996 : Character Design, Animation director.
 Kindaichi Case Files Operaza Kan Saigo no Satsujin (special) (movie)1996 : Character Design, Animation director.
 Gegege no Kitaro: Yōkai Tokkyū! Maboroshi no Kisha (movie)1997 : Character Design, Animation director.
 Kindaichi Case Files 2 - Satsuriku no Deep Blue (movie)1999 : Character Concept Design.
 Yu-Gi-Oh! (movie)1999 : Animation director.
 The Siamese - First Mission (movie)2001 : Character Design (main).
 Saint Seiya Heaven Chapter: Overture (movie)2004 : Character Design, Animation director.

Original Video Animations 
 Okubyo na Venus (OAV/VHS)1986 : Animation director.
 Amon Saga (OAV)1986 : Character Design, Animation Supervisor, Key Animator.
 Fuma no Kojirou : Yasha-hen (OAV)1989 : Character Design.
 Fuma no Kojirou : Seiken Sensou-hen (OAV)1990 : Character Design.
 Fuma no Kojirou : Fuma Hanran-hen (OAV)1992 : Character Design, Animation director.
 Dragon Fist (OAV)1991 : Character Design, Animation director.
 Babel II (OAV)1992 : Character Design.
 Saint Seiya: The Hades Chapter - Sanctuary : (OAV)2002 : Character Design, Chief Animation Director.
 Saint Seiya: The Hades Chapter - Inferno : (OAV)2005, 2006 : Character Design, Chief Animation Director.
 Saint Seiya: The Hades Chapter - Elysion : (OAV)2008 : Character Design, Chief Animation Director.

Video Games 
 BURAI: Jōken (Videogame) : Character Design.
 BURAI: Gekan - Kanketsu-hen (Videogame) : Character Design.
 BURAI: Hachigyoku no Yūshi Densetsu (Videogame) : Character Design.
 BURAI II: Yami Kōtei no Gyakushū (Videogame) : Character Design.

References

External links 
 
 Toei animation's Saint Seiya website
  Guía Saint Seiya, Shigo Araki.
 

1939 births
2011 deaths
Japanese animators
Japanese animated film directors
Japanese television directors
Japanese television producers
Japanese animated film producers
People from Nagoya
Anime character designers
Video game artists